Jamsam is a village in the Madhubani district of Bihar state, India.

Villages in Madhubani district